San Marino competed at the 2012 Winter Youth Olympics in Innsbruck, Austria. The San Marino team was made up of one athlete, an alpine skier and two officials. Alberto Zampagna will serve as the chef de mission.

Alpine skiing

San Marino qualified one boy in alpine skiing.

Boy

See also
San Marino at the 2012 Summer Olympics

References

Nations at the 2012 Winter Youth Olympics
2012 in Sammarinese sport
San Marino at the Youth Olympics